Kazimierz Zelek (27 March 1937 – 13 January 2019) was a Polish cross-country skier. He competed in the men's 15 kilometre event at the 1960 Winter Olympics.

References

1937 births
2019 deaths
Polish male cross-country skiers
Olympic cross-country skiers of Poland
Cross-country skiers at the 1960 Winter Olympics
Sportspeople from Zakopane